John Carpay is a Netherlands-born Canadian lawyer, the president of the Justice Centre for Constitutional Freedoms, and a newspaper columnist.

In 2021, Carpay made Canadian news and took a leave of absence from the JCCF after he hired a private investigator to follow the Manitoba chief justice who was presiding over a COVID-19 related court case in which Carpay was legal council in.

Early life and education 
Carpay was born in the Netherlands, before moving to British Columbia, Canada.

He has a bachelor of arts in political science from Université Laval and an Bachelor of Laws from the University of Calgary.

Career and advocacy 
He was called to the bar in 1999. He worked in civil litigation with Calgary legal firm Rooney Prentice before working for the Canadian Taxpayers Federation conservative advocacy organization and as the executive director of the Canadian Constitution Foundation.

As of 2023, Carpay was the president of Justice Centre for Constitutional Freedoms, which he founded in 2010. The organisation describes its mission to defend "the constitutional freedoms of Canadians through litigation and education."

Carpay has written columns for The National Post, The Calgary Herald, and Huffington Post.

In 2021, Carpay supported seven churches in their legal bid to fight COVID-19 public health regulations, and during that time, he hired a private investigator to follow Manitoba chief justice Glenn Joyal. Those actions prompted a misconduct complaint from human rights lawyer Richard Warman and critique from University of Alberta's vice dean of law Eric Adams, who described the action as a "tremendous, tremendous lapse of judgment." Carpay took indefinite leave from the JCCF in July 2021, before being reinstated as president in August 2021. Six of the nine members of the board of directors resigned following his reinstatement. An arrest warrant for was issued by Winnipeg Police in December 2022, prompting Carpay to present himself to Calgary Police Service, where he was arrested on December 30 before being released the next day. Carpay has been charged with "intimidation of a justice system participant and attempting to obstruct justice." The Law Society of Manitoba will bring professional misconduct against Carpay at a February 2023 hearing in Winnipeg.

Politics 
In 2018, Carpay drew criticism from Jason Kenny for comparing the LGBT flag to a swastika in a discussion on Rebel Media, for which he later apologised.

Carpay ran for the Reform Party in 1993 and the Wildrose Party in 2012. Carpay is a member of the United Conservative Party of Alberta.

References 

 

21st-century Canadian lawyers
20th-century Canadian lawyers
Dutch emigrants to Canada
Université Laval alumni
University of Calgary Faculty of Law alumni
Organization founders
Reform Party of Canada candidates in the 1993 Canadian federal election
Wildrose Party candidates in Alberta provincial elections
Canadian columnists
National Post people
Year of birth missing (living people)
Living people